The Eternal Chain is a 1952 Italian melodrama film directed by Anton Giulio Majano.

Plot
A naval officer becomes the lover of his brother's girlfriend. The latter kills a suitor of the girl; of the murder, however, the other is accused, who is forced to flee. Returning years after joining the Foreign Legion, he discovers that a son was born from the relationship; the brother opposes their union and accidentally dies, but before him he confesses his crime.

Cast
 Marcello Mastroianni as Walter Ronchi
 Gianna Maria Canale as Maria Raneri
 Marco Vicario as Sandro Ronchi
 Leda Gloria as Donna Teresa, madre di Maria
 Umberto Spadaro as Maresciallo della legione straniera
 Carlo Croccolo as Peppino
 Aldo Nicodemi as Filippo Lanza
 Olinto Cristina as Maestro Vallini
 Nietta Zocchi as The 'Alhambra' Owner
 Gisella Monaldi as Donna Carmela
 Duccio Sissia as Walter - Maria's son
 Corrado Mantoni as himself (as Corrado)
 Mario Galli
 Liana Billi
 Giulio Battiferri

References

External links

1952 films
1950s Italian-language films
1952 drama films
Italian black-and-white films
Films directed by Anton Giulio Majano
Italian drama films
Melodrama films
1950s Italian films